The house finch (Haemorhous mexicanus) is a bird in the finch family Fringillidae. It is native to western North America and has been introduced to the eastern half of the continent and Hawaii. This species and the other two American rosefinches are placed in the genus Haemorhous.

Description
This is a moderate-sized finch.

Adults have a long, square-tipped brown tail and are a brown or dull-brown color across the back with some shading into deep gray on the wing feathers. Breast and belly feathers may be streaked; the flanks usually are. In most cases, adult males' heads, necks and shoulders are reddish. This color sometimes extends to the belly and down the back, between the wings. Male coloration varies in intensity with the seasons and is derived from the berries and fruits in its diet. As a result, the colors range from pale straw-yellow through bright orange (both rare) to deep, intense red. Adult females have brown upperparts and streaked underparts.

Taxonomy
This bird belongs to the genus Haemorhous, together with the purple finch and Cassin's finch. These three species are not closely related to the similar Old World Carpodacus rosefinches, although they were formerly included in that genus.

Range and habitat
These birds are mainly permanent residents throughout their range; some northern and eastern birds migrate south. Their breeding habitat is urban and suburban areas across North America, as well as various semi-open areas in the west from southern Canada to the Mexican state of Oaxaca; the population in central Chiapas may be descended from escaped cagebirds. Analyses of nest records from House Finches in California spanning more than a century found that egg‐laying occurred significantly earlier in warmer springs.

Originally only a resident of Mexico and the southwestern United States, they were introduced to eastern North America in the 1940s. The birds were sold illegally in New York City as "Hollywood Finches", a marketing artifice. To avoid prosecution under the Migratory Bird Treaty Act of 1918, vendors and owners released the birds. They have since become naturalized; in largely unforested land across the eastern U.S. they have displaced the native purple finch and even the non-native house sparrow. In 1870 or before, they were introduced to Hawaii and are now abundant on all its major islands.

There are estimated to be anywhere from 267 million to 1.7 billion individuals across North America.

Instances of naturalization originating in escapes or releases of cage birds have been recorded in Europe, such as in 2020 in Murcia, (Spain).

In 2012, house finches positive for West Nile virus were found in northwestern Riverside County, CA.

Feeding

House finches forage on the ground or in vegetation normally. They primarily eat grains, seeds and berries, being voracious consumers of weed seeds such as nettle and dandelion; included are incidental small insects such as aphids. They are frequent visitors to bird feeders throughout the year, particularly if stocked with sunflower or nyjer seed, and will congregate at hanging nyjer sock feeders. The house finch is known to damage orchard fruit and consume commercially grown grain, but is generally considered an annoyance rather than a significant pest.

Breeding

Nests are made in cavities, including openings in buildings, hanging plants, and other cup-shaped outdoor decorations. Sometimes nests abandoned by other birds are used. Nests may be re-used for subsequent broods or in following years. The nest is built by the female, sometimes in as little as two days.

During courtship, the male will touch bills with the female. He may then present the female with choice bits of food, and if she mimics the behavior of a hungry chick, he may actually feed her. The male also feeds the female during breeding and incubation of the eggs, and raising of the young, and the male is the primary feeder of the fledgelings (who can be differentiated from the females by the pin feathers remaining on their heads). Females are typically attracted to the males with the deepest pigment of red to their head, more so than the occasional orange or yellowish-headed males that sometimes occur.

The female lays clutches of eggs from February through August, two or more broods per year with 2 to 6 eggs per brood, most commonly 4 or 5. The egg laying usually takes place in the morning, at the rate of one egg per day. The eggs are a pale bluish green with few black spots and a smooth, somewhat glossy surface. In response to mite infestation, which has a more deleterious effect on male chicks than on females, the mother finch may lay eggs containing females first, in order to reduce the length of time male chicks are exposed to mites. This strategy increases the likelihood that representative numbers of both sexes will survive. The female incubates the eggs for 12 to 14 days. Shortly after hatching, she removes the empty eggshells from the nest. The hatchlings are pink with closed eyes and tufts of fluffy down. The female always feeds the young, and the male usually joins in. The young are silent for the first seven or eight days, and subsequently start peeping during feedings. Initially, the mother carries fecal sacs out of the nest, but when the young become older, she no longer carries them all away, allowing droppings to accumulate around the edge of the nest. Before flying, the young often climb into adjacent plants, and usually fledge at about 11 to 19 days after hatching. Dandelion seeds are among the preferred seeds fed to the young. Contrary to the way most birds, even ones with herbivorous leanings as adults, tend to feed their nestlings animal matter in order to give them the protein necessary to grow, house finches are one of the few birds who feed their young only plant matter.

House finches are aggressive enough to drive other birds away from places such as feeders.

Parasites
The house finch may be infected by a number of parasites including Plasmodium relictum and Mycoplasma gallisepticum, which caused the population of house finches in eastern North America to crash during the 1990s.

The mite Pellonyssus reedi is often found on house finch nestlings, particularly for nests later in the season.

The brown-headed cowbird, a brood parasite, will lay its eggs in house finch nests, although the diet house finches feed their young is inadequate for the young cowbirds, which rarely survive.

References

External links

 Florida's Introduced Birds: House Finch ("Carpodacus mexicanus") – University of Florida fact sheet
 House Finch - Carpodacus mexicanus - USGS Patuxent Bird Identification InfoCenter
 House Finch Sound
 
  from 
 

house finch
Birds of North America
Birds of Mexico
Fauna of the San Francisco Bay Area
House finch
House finch